Pretend You're Alive - 10-Year Anniversary Edition: Rarities is a collection of demos, live recordings, and unreleased songs released by Lovedrug to commemorate the tenth anniversary of their debut full-length album, Pretend You're Alive.

Track listing

References

2012 albums
Lovedrug albums